John Fraser (born 1 August 1935) is an Australian former tennis player.

Career
Born in Melbourne, Victoria, Fraser attended St Kevins College 1943-1952 and then commenced studying medicine at Melbourne University graduating in 1958. He did three years at St Vincent's Hospital as a resident. In 1962,Neale, his brother, and John decided to go on a world-wide tennis tour starting in Egypt and ending in Japan. The highlight was that both brothers reached the semifinal of the Wimbledon singles with Neale losing to Rod Laver and John losing to his compatriot Martin Mulligan in three sets. Six of the quarterfinalists in the Wimbledon men's singles that year were Australians. Fraser also reached the semifinal of the Wimbledon doubles, partnered with Rod Laver, losing to Fred Stolle and Bob Hewitt. He also reached the third round of the French men's singles losing to Pierre Damon. In 1963 he reached the quarterfinal of the Australian Open losing to another compatriot Roy Emerson in straight sets. He was ranked No.8 in 1963 Australian rankings behind Rod Laver, Roy Emerson, Neale Fraser, Fred Stolle, Ken Fletcher, Martin Mulligan and Bob Hewitt. He never achieved the fame of his brother Neale Fraser, a world and Wimbledon champion. John Fraser continued to play regularly in the Australian Open, but never played in any other grand slam championship. In 1965, he was appointed the medical officer for the Fitzroy Football Club serving the club until 1982 and then he became the medical officer for the Carlton Football Club till 1990. He was the medical officer for the Australian Tennis Open from 1973 till 2003.

References

External links
 
 

1935 births
Living people
Australian male tennis players
Tennis players from Melbourne
20th-century Australian people